A te may refer to:

A te, 2013 album by Fiorella Mannoia 
"A Te", 1961 song by Anna Maria (singer) 
"A Te", 1972 song by Iva Zanicchi
"A te", 2008 Jovanotti song
"A Te", 1968 song by Jimmy Fontana
"A Te", 1979s ong by Roberto Vecchioni